Tábua is a town and municipality of the Coimbra District, in Portugal. The municipality contains the town of Tábua. The population in 2011 was 12,071, in an area of 199.79 km².

Parishes
Administratively, the municipality is divided into 11 civil parishes (freguesias):
 Ázere e Covelo
 Candosa
 Carapinha
 Covas e Vila Nova de Oliveirinha
 Espariz e Sinde
 Midões
 Mouronho
 Pinheiro de Coja e Meda de Mouros
 Póvoa de Midões
 São João da Boa Vista
 Tábua

Notable people 
 Sara Beirão (1880 in Tábua - 1974) a writer, journalist, women's rights activist and philanthropist.
 António Castanheira Neves (born 1929 in Tábua) a Portuguese legal philosopher and academic
 André Fontes (born 1985 in Tábua) a footballer with over 330 club caps

References